Original Media was an American production company founded in 2002 by Charlie Corwin and Clara Markowicz. The company produced feature films, reality television, scripted television, and digital programming. Some of Original Media's television series include the TLC series Miami Ink and its spinoffs LA Ink and NY Ink, the Bravo series The Rachel Zoe Project, Oprah Winfrey Network's The Gayle King Show, Discovery Channel's Storm Chasers and Dual Survival, TLC and Destination America's BBQ Pitmasters, History's Swamp People, DIY Network's King of Dirt, Logo TV's Be Good Johnny Weir and NBC's The Philanthropist.

The company, headquartered in New York City, was a subsidiary of Endemol USA, a leading producer of television programming specializing in reality and non-scripted genres for network and cable television.

In 2017, Original Media and sister company True Entertainment merged to form Truly Original.

References

Banijay
Endemol
mass media companies disestablished in 2017
mass media companies established in 2002
mass media companies of the United States